Seminars in Orthodontics is a quarterly peer-reviewed medical journal publishing review articles in the field of orthodontics. It was established in 1995 and is published by Elsevier. Its first guest editor was Robert J. Isaacson (Virginia Commonwealth University), and its current editor-in-chief is Elliott M. Moskowitz. According to the Journal Citation Reports, the journal has a 2017 impact factor of 0.500.

References

External links

Dentistry journals
Orthodontics
Elsevier academic journals
Publications established in 1995
Review journals
Quarterly journals
English-language journals